Sandra Richards (1949—2005) was a netball player from the Christchurch area of New Zealand's South Island, who played on four occasions for New Zealand, winning a silver medal in the 1971 world championships.

Netball career
Sandra (Sandy) Richards (née Norman) was born on 8 March 1949. A member of the Canterbury region netball team on New Zealand's South Island, she was chosen to play for the Silver Ferns, the New Zealand national netball team, in 1970. Playing as Sandra Norman, her first match was against Singapore on 3 November 1970, en route to the 1971 world championships, which were held in Kingston, Jamaica at the end of 1970 and beginning of 1971. New Zealand came second in the championships, losing 48–42 to Australia. Richards played in the Goal shooter (GS) and Goal attack (GA) positions.

Death
Richards died on 3 June 2005. A trophy awarded annually to its "Most Outstanding Senior Player" by the Belfast Netball Club, in the suburbs of Christchurch, is in Richards' name.

References

1949 births
2005 deaths
New Zealand international netball players
1971 World Netball Championships players